"Denver" is a song written by Larry Gatlin, and recorded by American country music group Larry Gatlin & the Gatlin Brothers Band.  It was released in March 1984 as the second single from the album Houston to Denver.  The song reached number 7 on the Billboard Hot Country Singles & Tracks chart.

Chart performance

References

1984 singles
Larry Gatlin songs
Columbia Records singles
Songs written by Larry Gatlin
1984 songs